Ch'ŏngnam-gu is a district in South P'yŏngan province, North Korea.

Administrative districts

The district is split into 9 tong (neighborhoods) and 2 ri (villages).

Transportation
Ch'ŏngnam district is served by the Sŏhae Line of the Korean State Railway.

References

External links
  Map of Pyongan provinces
  Detailed map

Districts of South Pyongan